ZTreeWin, an orthodox file manager for Microsoft Windows, is a (heavily improved) clone of XTree. Like XTree, it logs (preloads) filenames and attributes into memory so that search and sort operations are extremely fast. By making use of the large memories of modern computers it allows the logging of millions of files.

ZTreeWin makes use of Win32 consoles. It is primarily key-driven, but it also supports the use of the mouse.

The ZAAP architecture is available which supports the integration of add-in applications.

Features
Complete keyboard support (as well as mouse)
Tree and/or file views
Split screen (dual-pane) option
 search
File name search
File content search (hex, unicode, text)
File viewer with multiple view modes (hex, text, dump)
Set, adjust or increment timestamps (camera co-ordination)
Duplicate file detection
Branch (or 'flat') file view - see all files in an entire directory and subdirectories in one view
Global files view - see all files (or tagged files) on every logged drive
Tagged files (session-long selection, e.g. once tagged (selected), a file remains tagged until explicitly untagged)
Batch file creation using tagged filenames with parameters
Displays size or number of files of each folder or branch (total of all folders below it)
Powerful and flexible renaming of (multiple) files and/or folders w/search & replace & numeric increment capabilities.
File comparison
Directory & Branch comparisons
User-definable scriptable menu
Integrated support for Zip and Rar archive files
Extensible support for many other archive files
Can be run from floppy disk or USB flash-drive without installation
Session save & resume
Ability to NOT log (skip) certain directories that you never want to see with wildcard abilities (can override)

See also
Comparison of file managers

External links

What happened to XTreeGold ?
The history of XTree

File managers
Orthodox file managers
Windows-only software

de:Xtree
it:XTree
pl:XTree
pt:Xtree